Vue is a commune in the Loire-Atlantique department in western France.

Population

See also
Communes of the Loire-Atlantique department

References

Communes of Loire-Atlantique
Pornic Agglo Pays de Retz